Alan Cyril Walker (23 August 1938 – 20 November 2017) was the Evan Pugh Professor of Biological Anthropology and Biology at the Pennsylvania State University and a research scientist for the National Museum of Kenya.

Life 
He received his B.A. from Cambridge University in 1962, and his PhD from the University of London in 1967.  In 2000 he received an honorary D.Sc. from the University of Chicago.

Walker was a paleoanthropologist who worked on primate and human evolution.

Walker was a member of the team led by Richard Leakey responsible for the 1984 discovery of the skeleton of the so-called Turkana Boy, and in 1985 Walker himself discovered the Black Skull near Lake Turkana in Kenya.

Awards
Walker was awarded a MacArthur Fellowship "genius grant" in 1988. 
In 1997 he received the Rhône-Poulenc Award from the Royal Society for The Wisdom of the Bones. During the award ceremony, Terry Pratchett, chairman of the judges, said "We were fascinated by the way the forensic net was spread out, bringing so many sciences to bear on the mystery of this million-year-old teenager."  The following year he received the International Fondation Fyssen Prize in Paris.

He became a member of the American Academy of Arts and Sciences in 1996, and was elected a Fellow of the Royal Society in 1999. In 2003 he was named a member of the United States National Academy of Sciences.

In 2017 he received the Charles R. Darwin Lifetime Achievement Award from the American Association of Physical Anthropologists.

Bibliography
 1996 (with his wife Pat Shipman). The Wisdom of Bones. Weidenfeld & Nicolson, London.
 1993 (with Richard Leakey) eds. The Nariokotome Homo erectus Skeleton. Cambridge MA: Harvard University Press. 
 1997 (with Meave Leakey). Early Hominid Fossils from Africa. Scientific American 276, 6, 74–79 
 2005. The Ape in the Tree: An Intellectual and Natural History of Proconsul. The Belknap Press of Harvard UP, Cambridge, Mass.

See also
 List of fossil sites (with link directory)
 List of hominina (hominid) fossils (with images)

References

External links
Alan Walker's faculty page at Penn State
Alan Walker forecasts the future, New Scientist
Alan Walker page at www.mnsu.edu
Ten scholars to receive honorary degrees

1938 births
2017 deaths
People from Leicester
Alumni of the University of Cambridge
Alumni of the University of London
British paleoanthropologists
20th-century British biologists
21st-century British biologists
Human evolution theorists
MacArthur Fellows
Pennsylvania State University faculty
Anthropology educators
Science teachers
Fellows of the Royal Society
Foreign associates of the National Academy of Sciences